Mindaugas Kuzminskas (born 19 October 1989) is a Lithuanian professional basketball player for Pınar Karşıyaka of the Basketbol Süper Ligi (BSL). He also represents the Lithuanian national team. He is 2.05 m (6'8 ") tall, and he can play both the small forward and power forward positions.

Professional career

Europe
Kuzminskas started his basketball career in 2006 with Sakalai where he played for one season. For the 2007–08 season, he moved to Perlas. In the summer of 2008, he signed with Šiauliai.

In September 2009, Kuzminskas signed with Žalgiris, but he stayed one more season on loan with Šiauliai. In 2010, he joined Žalgiris and stayed with the team for three seasons.

In June 2013, Kuzminskas signed a contract with the Spanish team Unicaja. On 22 October 2015, Kuzminskas scored his EuroLeague career-high 23 points and led his team to triumph versus the Maccabi Tel Aviv 93–82 in Tel Aviv. Then on 13 November, Kuzminskas played his most efficient EuroLeague game of 30 PIR points (22 points (2FG: 6/7, 3FG: 3/5, FT: 1/1), 4 rebounds, 3 steals) and led Unicaja to another outstanding away-game victory, this time against CSKA Moscow, winning 86–78. In 36 league games for Unicaja in 2015–16, he averaged 10.3 points, 3.0 rebounds and 1.1 assists per game.

NBA
On 9 July 2016, Kuzminskas signed with the New York Knicks. On 25 October 2016, he made his debut for the Knicks in their season opener, scoring seven points in nine minutes off the bench in a 117–88 loss to the Cleveland Cavaliers. On 12 January 2017, he scored a season-high 19 points in a 104–89 win over the Chicago Bulls.

On 12 November 2017, Kuzminskas was waived by the Knicks to make room for the return of the suspended Joakim Noah. He appeared in 68 games during his rookie season, but just one game to begin his second season.

Return to Europe
On 1 January 2018, Kuzminskas signed with the Italian club Olimpia Milano. On 1 July 2019, Kuzminskas parted ways with Olimpia Milano after a season and a half playing for them and winning one Italian championship.

On 22 July 2019, Kuzminskas signed a two-year contract with Greek club Olympiacos. On 9 November 2019, with playing time declining since October, Kuzminskas was released from the Greek club. 

On 11 November 2019, Kuzminskas signed a €1.5 million deal with Lokomotiv Kuban. Kuzminskas was selected to the 2020 VTB United League All-Star Game where he scored 14 points, grabbed 1 rebound and dished out 4 assists. During the 2020-21 season, Kuzminskas averaged 13 points και 4.5 rebounds in 40 games in the VTB United League and the EuroCup.

On 5 July 2021 he signed with the Russian team Zenit Saint Petersburg of the VTB United League and the EuroLeague. He left the team after the 2022 Russian invasion of Ukraine.

On 21 September 2022 he signed with Pınar Karşıyaka of the Basketbol Süper Ligi (BSL).

Career statistics

EuroLeague

|-
| style="text-align:left;"|2010–11
| style="text-align:left;" rowspan="3"|Žalgiris
| 8 || 1 || 6.8 || .357 || .167 || .667 || 1.0 || .1 || .3 || .0 || 1.6 || 1.3
|-
| style="text-align:left;"|2011–12
| 12 || 0 || 8.4 || .555 || .143 || .706 || 1.3 || .2 || .2 || .0 || 2.8 || 2.8
|-
| style="text-align:left;"|2012–13
| 23 || 5 || 14.1 || .527 || .324 || .829 || 3.1 || .3 || .5 || .2 || 7.1 || 7.7
|-
| style="text-align:left;"|2013–14
| style="text-align:left;" rowspan="3"|Unicaja
| 24 || 16 || 14.2 || .472 || .314 || .633 || 2.3 || .5 || .5 || .3 || 6.3 || 5.6
|-
| style="text-align:left;"|2014–15
| 24 || 20 || 21.8 || .450 || .275 || .813 || 4.5 || 1.5 || .9 || .4 || 10.0 || 12.5
|-
| style="text-align:left;"|2015–16
| 23 || 20 || 21.3 || .486 || .377 || .827 || 3.4 || 1.0 || .6 || .3 || 12.0 || 11.6
|-
| style="text-align:left;"|2017–18
| style="text-align:left;" rowspan="2"|Olimpia
| 14 || 13 || 21.6 || .474 || .432 || .795 || 2.4 || 1.4 || .5 || .6 || 10.9 || 9.6
|-
| style="text-align:left;"|2018–19
| 30 || 1 || 17.0 || .514 || .469 || .859 || 3.3 || .7 || .5 || .3 || 8.5 || 8.8
|- class="sortbottom"
| style="text-align:center;" colspan="2"|Career
| 158 || 76 || 16.5 || .475 || .359 || .800 || 3.0 || .8 || .5 || .2 || 8.1 || 8.3

Eurocup

|-
| style="text-align:left;"|2019–20
| style="text-align:left;" rowspan="2"|Lokomotiv
| 4 || 0 || 23.3 || .500 || .385 || .846 || 2.0 || 1.5 || .5 || .3 || 12.5 || 11
|-
| style="text-align:left;"|2020–21
| 19 || 15 || 26.4 || .550 || .344 || .775 || 4.4 || 1.5 || .3 || .7 || 12.4 || 13.6

NBA

Regular season

|-
| style="text-align:left;"|
| style="text-align:left;"|New York
| 68 || 5 || 14.9 || .428 || .321 || .809 || 1.9 || 1.0 || .4 || .2 || 6.3
|-
| style="text-align:left;"|
| style="text-align:left;"|New York
| 1 || 0 || 2.0 || .000 ||  ||  || .0 || .0 || .0 || .0 || .0
|- class="sortbottom"
| style="text-align:center;" colspan="2"|Career
| 69 || 5 || 14.8 || .426 || .321 || .809 || 1.8 || 1.0 || .4 || .2 || 6.2

Personal life
Both of Kuzminskas' parents were professional athletes, his father, Vladas, played table tennis, while his mother, Zita, was a professional basketball player. He also has an older brother, Saulius, who was also a professional basketball player between 1999 and 2015. When Kuzminskas was 13 he visited Canada. During his trip to Canada, he toured the Toronto Raptors' arena and went to Kretinga, a Lithuanian Youth Summer Camp in Wasaga Beach, Ontario. In 2017, after 6 years of dating, he married Lithuanian ballet dancer Eglė Andreikaitė. The couple announced their separation in 2019.

Don't Snooze On Kuz
While in the NBA, a fan-made Instagram account entitled "dontsnoozeonkuz" gained popularity through various satirical and serious postings about Kuzminskas. The account mainly focused on promoting Kuzminskas as a basketball player, and frequently requested his then-current team, the New York Knicks, to increase his playing time. Kuzminskas followed "dontsnoozeonkuz," which has amassed over 1,200 followers as of 29 June 2017. "Dontsnoozeonkuz" is still active today despite the end of Kuzminskas' NBA tenure.

References

External links
Mindaugas Kuzminskas at draftexpress.com
Mindaugas Kuzminskas at euroleague.net
Mindaugas Kuzminskas at fiba.com
Kuzminskas's European stats at basketball-reference.com

1989 births
Living people
2014 FIBA Basketball World Cup players
2019 FIBA Basketball World Cup players
Baloncesto Málaga players
Basketball players at the 2016 Summer Olympics
Basketball players from Vilnius
BC Šiauliai players
BC Žalgiris players
Karşıyaka basketball players
Lega Basket Serie A players
Liga ACB players
Lithuanian expatriate basketball people in Greece
Lithuanian expatriate basketball people in Italy
Lithuanian expatriate basketball people in Russia
Lithuanian expatriate basketball people in Spain
Lithuanian expatriate basketball people in the United States
Lithuanian men's basketball players
National Basketball Association players from Lithuania
New York Knicks players
Olimpia Milano players
Olympiacos B.C. players
Olympic basketball players of Lithuania
PBC Lokomotiv-Kuban players
Power forwards (basketball)
Small forwards
Undrafted National Basketball Association players